The 1966–67 Chicago Black Hawks season was the Hawks' 41st season in the National Hockey League, and the team was coming off a team record 37 victories in the 1965–66 season, as they finished in second place in the NHL.  The Black Hawks then were upset by the fourth place Detroit Red Wings in the NHL semi-finals, losing in six games.

Chicago started the season very strong, leading the NHL with a record of 8–2–2 in their first 12 games, and continued their winning ways all season long.  The Black Hawks finished the season with a club record in wins with 41, and points with 94, as Chicago finished in first place for the first time in team history. The Hawks were 17 points better than the second place Montreal Canadiens, and heavy favorites to win their second Stanley Cup of the decade.

Offensively, the Hawks were led by Stan Mikita, who led the NHL with 97 points, winning the Art Ross Trophy, Hart Memorial Trophy, and the Lady Byng Trophy. His 97 points tied the NHL record, set by teammate Bobby Hull in the 1965–66 season.  Hull recorded his second straight 50+ goal season, as he scored 52 goals, and added 28 assists to finish second in the league with 80 points.  Kenny Wharram finished fourth in league scoring, as he scored 31 goals and 65 points, while Phil Esposito and Doug Mohns were not far behind, earning 61 and 60 points respectively. Team captain Pierre Pilote anchored the blueline, scoring 6 goals and 52 points.  Fellow defenseman Ed Van Impe led the team with 111 penalty minutes.

In goal, Denis DeJordy earned the majority of playing time, as he won a team high 22 games, while posting a 2.46 GAA and 4 shutouts. Glenn Hall had his playing time cut back, however, he had a very solid season, winning 19 games, while having a team best 2.38 GAA, and earning 2 shutouts.  DeJordy and Hull earned the Vezina Trophy as the Hawks allowed the fewest goals against in the league.

The Hawks opened the playoffs against the Toronto Maple Leafs. The Leafs finished the season in third place, as they had a record of 32–27–11, earning 75 points, 19 fewer than the Black Hawks. The series opened with two games at Chicago Stadium, and the Hawks had an easy time defeating Toronto in the series opener, with a 5–2 victory, however, the Leafs stormed back in the second game, beating Chicago 3–1 to even the series up.  The series shifted to Maple Leaf Gardens for the next two games, and the teams once again split the games, as Toronto won the third game by a 3–1 score, and Chicago took the fourth game, holding off the Leafs for a 4–3 win. Game 5 returned to Chicago, however, Toronto took a 3–2 series lead, beating Chicago 4–2. Game 6 was played in Toronto, and the Maple Leafs completed the upset, winning the game 3–1 to advance to the Stanley Cup finals, and end Chicago's season.

Offseason

Draft picks
Chicago's draft picks at the 1966 NHL Amateur Draft held at the Mount Royal Hotel in Montreal, Quebec.

Season standings

Record vs. opponents

Game log

Regular season

Stanley Cup Playoffs

Playoff stats

Scoring leaders

Goaltending

References

External links
Hockey-Reference
Rauzulu's Street
Goalies Archive
HockeyDB

Chicago Blackhawks seasons
Chicago
Chicago